Mickler is a surname. Notable people with the surname include:

People with the surname
 Ernest Matthew Mickler (1940-1988), American cookbook author 
 Georg Mickler (1892-1915), German Olympic athlete 
 Ingrid Becker (Ingrid Mickler-Becker, born 1942), West German athlete, sometimes recorded incorrectly as Ingrid Mickler
 Michael Mickler, notable alumnus of the Unification Theological Seminary
 Robert Mickler (1922-2003), owner Bob Mickler’s, Lexington KY

Fictional characters
 Jack and Marilyn Mickler, in the 1995 film Don Juan DeMarco

See also

 Mackler, a surname
 Mickler-O'Connell Bridge, over the Matanzas River, Florida, U.S.